Robin Victor Sutcliffe (born 10 July 1980) is a former English cricketer.  Sutcliffe was a right-handed batsman who bowled right-arm fast-medium.  He was born in Hemel Hempstead, Hertfordshire.

Sutcliffe played 2 first-class for Northamptonshire in 1999, against Cambridge University and Sri Lanka A.  In 2 first-class matches, he scored 6 runs at a batting average of 6.00, with a high score of 6*.  With the ball he took 4 wickets at a bowling average of 41.00, with best figures of 2/88.

References

External links
Robin Sutcliffe at Cricinfo
Robin Sutcliffe at CricketArchive

1980 births
Living people
Sportspeople from Hemel Hempstead
English cricketers
Northamptonshire cricketers